Albert Schatz (1879–1940) was a law professor at the University of Dijon and historian of 19th century individualism and Jean-Baptiste Say.

His 1907 work L'individualisme économique et social (Individualism - Economic and Social) first outlines a basis for the classical liberal doctrine, in France to be traced back to the Physiocrats. Then he talks about the diverse aspect of individualism in the 19th century: from Charles Dunoyer to Mill, and to Bastiat. He also talks about individualism in relation to politics (liberal democracy), its relationship to religion, and finally to Spencer's sociology, and anarchism.

References

External links
 Gallica Has Schatz's work L'individualisme économique et social (1907)

1879 births
1940 deaths
20th-century French historians
University of Burgundy alumni